Actinometers are instruments used to measure the heating power of radiation. They are used in meteorology to measure solar radiation as pyranometers, pyrheliometers and net radiometers.

An actinometer is a chemical system or physical device which determines the number of
photons in a beam integrally or per unit time. This name is commonly
applied to devices used in the ultraviolet and visible wavelength ranges.
For example, solutions of iron(III) oxalate can be used as a chemical
actinometer, while bolometers, thermopiles, and photodiodes are physical
devices giving a reading that can be correlated to the number of photons
detected.

History

The actinometer was invented by John Herschel in 1825; he introduced the term actinometer, the first of many uses of the prefix actin for scientific instruments, effects, and processes.

The actinograph is a related device for estimating the actinic power of lighting for photography.

Chemical actinometry 

Chemical actinometry involves measuring radiant flux via the yield from a chemical reaction. This process requires a chemical with a known quantum yield and easily analyzed reaction products.

Choosing an actinometer 

Potassium ferrioxalate is commonly used, as it is simple to use and sensitive over a wide range of relevant wavelengths (254 nm to 500 nm). Other actinometers include malachite green leucocyanides, vanadium(V)–iron(III) oxalate and monochloroacetic acid, however all of these actinometers undergo dark reactions, that is, they react in the absence of light. This is undesirable since it will have to be corrected for. Organic actinometers like butyrophenone or piperylene are analysed by gas chromatography. Other actinometers are more specific in terms of the range of wavelengths at which quantum yields have been determined. Reinecke's salt K[Cr(NH3)2(NCS)4] reacts in the near-UV region although it is thermally unstable.  Uranyl oxalate has been used historically but is very toxic and cumbersome to analyze.

Recent investigations into nitrate photolysis
have used 2-nitrobenzaldehyde and benzoic acid as a radical scavenger for hydroxyl radicals produced in the photolysis of hydrogen peroxide and sodium nitrate.  However, they originally used ferrioxalate actinometry to calibrate the quantum yields for the hydrogen peroxide photolysis.  Radical scavengers proved a viable method of measuring production of hydroxyl radical.

Chemical actinometry in the visible range

Meso-diphenylhelianthrene can be used for chemical actinometry in the visible range (400–700 nm). This chemical measures in the  475–610 nm range, but measurements in wider spectral ranges can be done with this chemical if the emission spectrum of the light source is known.

See also

 Actinograph

References

Radiometry
Measuring instruments
English inventions